The 2021 Eurométropole Tour was the 80th edition of the Eurométropole Tour and the fifth edition since it became a one day race. It was held on 29 September 2021 as part of the 2021 UCI Europe Tour and the 2021 UCI ProSeries calendars. This edition was the race's first in the UCI ProSeries; the 2020 edition was expected to feature in the inaugural UCI ProSeries but was cancelled due to the COVID-19 pandemic. The race was originally scheduled for 2 October, but after Paris–Roubaix was postponed to 3 October, race organisers decided to reschedule the race in order to attract a more competitive field.

The race, which took place in Walloon Belgium near the border with France, featured a hilly route covering . The first  of the race saw riders travel west from the start in La Louvière to the finish city of Tournai, traversing one sprint point in Lessines (Souvenir Criquielion) and five short but steep hills. Once the race reached Tournai, riders then completed five laps of a  circuit around the city, with each lap featuring an ascent of the Col de la Croix Jubaru. Additionally, each passage through the finish line before the end of the race was a sprint point; in order, these were the Souvenirs Duquennoy, Weylandt, Demoitié, Rossolini, and Dubois. Each of the six souvenirs was named after a deceased figure in cycling. The first four were professional cyclists: Criquielion and Duquennoy died of illness, while Weylandt and Demoitié were fatally injured in separate racing incidents. Rossolini was an announcer at several cycling events, including the Tour de France, while Dubois was a media reporter.

Teams 
12 of the 19 UCI WorldTeams, nine UCI ProTeams, and three UCI Continental teams made up the 24 teams that participated in the race. In total, 163 riders started the race, of which 133 finished.

UCI WorldTeams

 
 
 
 
 
 
 
 
 
 
 
 

UCI ProTeams

 
 
 
 
 
 
 
 
 

UCI Continental Teams

Result

References

Sources

External links 
 

Eurométropole Tour
Eurométropole Tour
Eurométropole Tour
Eurométropole Tour